John Acclom was the name of two Members of Parliament:

John Acclom (14th-century politician)
John Acclom (15th-century politician) (1395–1458)